The Open d'Andorra is an international figure skating competition held annually in Canillo, Andorra, usually in November. Medals may be awarded in men's singles, ladies' singles, and ice dancing on the senior, junior, and novice levels.

Senior medalists

Men

Ladies

Ice dancing

Junior medalists

Men

Ladies

Ice dancing

Advanced novice medalists

Men

Ladies

Ice dancing

References

External links 
 Federació Andorrana d'Esports de Gel

Figure skating competitions